Igor Yevgrafov (born 1955) is a retired Soviet  swimmer who won a bronze medal in the 1500 m freestyle event at the 1974 European Aquatics Championships He also won national titles in the same event in 1973 and 1975 and set a European record in the 800 m freestyle in 1975.

References

1955 births
Living people
Russian male freestyle swimmers
Soviet male swimmers
European Aquatics Championships medalists in swimming
Swimmers from Saint Petersburg